Anne Marjanna Nurmi (born 22 August 1968) is a Finnish singer, composer and keyboard player who is a member of the band Lacrimosa. She lives in Switzerland.

Nurmi was born in Tampere. In her youth she sang in church choirs and began playing keyboards. Nurmi is a contralto singer. 

In 1987, Nurmi and a singer named Jyrki started a gothic rock band called Noidat. In 1989, two more members, Nauku and Toby, joined the band. The band then changed its name to Two Witches and started writing its lyrics in English.

In 1993, Two Witches toured together with Lacrimosa, where Anne met the German-born musician Tilo Wolff. Tilo was so fascinated by Anne's voice that he invited her to join his project and so Anne became a member of Lacrimosa in 1993.

Discography

Lacrimosa albums

Studio albums

Live albums

Compilations

References

External links 
 Lacrimosa

1968 births
Living people
musicians from Tampere
Women heavy metal singers
21st-century Finnish women singers
Finnish heavy metal singers
Finnish keyboardists
Finnish expatriates in Switzerland
Finnish expatriates in Germany
20th-century Finnish women singers